The Indian locomotive class WAP-7 is a class of 25 kV AC electric locomotives that was developed in 1999 by Chittaranjan Locomotive Works (CLW) for Indian Railways. The model name stands for broad gauge (W), AC Current (A), Passenger traffic (P) engine, 7th generation (7). They entered service in 2000. A total of 1461 WAP-7 have been built, with more units being built at CLW, Banaras Locomotive Works (BLW) and Patiala Locomotive Works (PLW).

The WAP-7 is one of the most successful locomotives of Indian Railways serving passenger trains for over 23 years. It is a passenger variant of the WAG-9 freight locomotive with a modified gear ratio to pull lighter loads at higher speeds. The WAP-7 is capable of hauling 24 coach trains at speeds .

History 
It is now largely used by Northern Railways (NR), South Central Railways (SCR), Central Railways (CR), South East Central Railways (SECR), South Eastern Railways (SER), West Central Railways (WCR), Eastern Railways (ER), Western Railways (WR), North Central Railways (NCR), South Western Railways (SWR), Southern Railways (SR), East Central Railways (ECR), East Coast Railways (ECoR), North Eastern Railways (NER) etc among other zones. As of October 2021, all of which are fitted with H-type transition couplers which are compatible with both screw coupling and centre-buffer coupling. In February 2017, Banaras Locomotive Works built their first WAP 7 class locomotive. 

In 2019, a variant of the WAP-7, designated the WAP-7HS, was introduced for higher speeds. Indian Railways plans to use the WAP-7HS for Shatabdi, Rajdhani, and Duronto express trains.

Head-on Generation (HOG)
A main feature of Majority locomotives of this class is that they eliminate the need to have separate End on Generation (EOG) sets or DG (Diesel Generator) sets for supplying power to the train resulting in significant savings on maintenance and running costs. This technology, called HOG or "Head On Generation", transfers electric power from the loco's pantograph to the coaches instead of EOG where a power car equipped with diesel generator capable of generating adequate power of 3-phase 50 Hz 415 V / 750 V AC (called 'head-end power') is provided at either end of the train rake to supply power.

Locomotive sheds

Gallery

See also
Indian Railways
Locomotives of India
Rail transport in India

References

External links

5 ft 6 in gauge locomotives
25 kV AC locomotives
Co-Co locomotives
Electric locomotives of India